KTWG (801 AM) is a radio station broadcasting a religious radio format. Licensed to Hagåtña, Guam, United States, it serves Guam and Marianas Islands. The station is currently owned by Edward H. Poppe, Jr. and Frances W. Poppe, and is managed by Leilani Dahilig. The station's studios are located in Piti.

While the station broadcasts at 801 kHz, many American radios, especially the digital readout variety, were capable of tuning in AM stations in 10 kHz increments only. Therefore, in the station's marketing, the nearest frequency, "800", is used instead. Stations in Guam fall within the jurisdiction of the Geneva Frequency Plan of 1975, instead of the North American Regional Broadcasting Agreement, whose coverage includes the U.S. mainland.

KTWG is the primary entry point for the Emergency Alert System in Guam and the Northern Mariana Islands.

History
KTWG went on air November 1, 1974. It was owned by Trans World Radio Pacific and initially operated on 770 kHz. A move to 800/801 was approved in 1978.

External links
 KTWG official website
 
 
FCC History Cards for KTWG

TWG
Radio stations established in 1982
1982 establishments in Guam
Hagåtña, Guam